Lemonada Media is an American podcast network. The company was founded in 2019 by Jessica Cordova Kramer and Stephanie Wittels Wachs. In 2019, Lemonada Media debuted their first podcast, Last Day. As of 2022, Lemonada has launched more than 20 podcasts.

History 
In 2018, Cordova Kramer and Wittels Wachs met after discovering they had each lost a brother to accidental overdoses. Cordova Kramer reached out to Wittels Wachs after hearing her in an interview. Wittels Wachs initially said no to a podcast partnership with Cordova Cramer but later changed her mind. In 2019, they launched Lemonada Media and their first podcast, Last Day which explores the final days of people who have died to opioids, suicide, and gun violence. The company set out to make the hard things in life a little easier for listeners to cope with. The company's name refers to the adage "turning lemons into lemonade."

Last Day is Lemonada Media's flagship podcast. The first season focused on the opioid epidemic. The first episode covered the last days of Cordova Kramer's brother prior to his fatal overdose. The second season of Last Day focused on suicide and was sponsored by The Jed Foundation, a nonprofit focused on suicide prevention.

In 2019, Lemonada Media debuted two additional podcasts, Good Kids and As Me with Sinéad. In April 2020, In the Bubble hosted by Andy Slavitt debuted. In March 2022, Lemonada Media had more than 20 original shows. These include The Cost of Care, The Untold Story: Policing and Good Sex.

In 2020, Lemonada show In the Bubble won the "Favorite Shows" award of Apple Podcasts "Shows of the Year". Last day also won iHeartRadio's Podcast Award for Best Wellness and Fitness Podcast. Lemonada shows received an average of two million listens in each month of 2020.

Lemonada partnered with Neighborhood Villages in late 2020, an organization that advocates for policy reform for early childhood education and care, to create No One Is Coming to Save Us hosted by former ABC news correspondent Gloria Riviera. The podcast discusses the U.S. childcare system. Kristin Bell has made guest appearances.

In 2021, Lemonada added 10 podcasts to its network including, Written Off and Believe Her. Believe Her debuted at the top of the podcast ratings charts. They launched, BEING Studios, a new division to develop a new audio genre called Audio Reality, a cross of reality programming and podcasting. Their debut show, BEING Trans was executive produced by Kasey Barrett who has previously worked on Keeping Up with the Kardashians, The Real World, and Born This Way. Wittels Wachs stated that creating Being Trans was intended to build the empathy. The second season of BEING studios features senior citizens and is called BEING Golden.

In 2022, Add to Cart won the iHeartRadio Podcast Award for Best Beauty and Fashion Podcast.

Lemonada has a global presence with its two shows in Europe: As Me with Sinéad (Ireland) and In Giro Con Fra (Italy).

Organization 
Jessica Cordova Kramer is the company's CEO. She previously served as the executive producer of Pod Save the People. Stephanie Wittels Wachs is the company's chief creative officer. She previously published the book: Everything is Horrible and Wonderful.

In 2020, the company reported $1.5 million in revenue. In 2021, they reported nearly $5 million in revenue. In January 2022, Lemonada Media announced they had secured $8 million in Series A funding and had 43 full-time employees.

Podcasts 

Lemonada has plans to expand the number of shows to more than 30 in 2022.

After 1954 
In 1954, the Supreme Court ruled in the case of Brown v Board of Education that the segregation of white and Black students was unconstitutional. The After 1954 podcast, hosted by Aimée Eubanks Davis, explores this historic event and its unintended consequence–the firing of approximately 38,000 Black teachers in the Southern states. Davis also explores the importance of Black educators as key figures in the lives of Black children.

Add to Cart 
Add to Cart is co-hosted by journalist SuChin Pak and writer, comedian, and director Kulap Vilaysack. Their podcast focuses on shopping and consumerism, exploring trending products and discussing whether those products are worth the cost.

As Me with Sinéad 
As Me is hosted by teacher, fashion enthusiast, and disability activist Sinéad Burke. Burke has also given a TED Talk on design accessibility, and was a guest speaker at the World Economic Forum in Davos. Burke has a suite of high-profile guests on her podcast including Victoria Beckham and Jamie Lee Curtis. Burke has also made a guest appearance on Lemonada Media's podcast Good Kids.

References

External links 
 

Podcasting companies
American companies established in 2019